Jean-Maurice Mourat (born March 23, 1945 in Vendée) is a classical music guitarist, composer and former director of musical conservatories. He writes music for guitar, as well as for flute and piano. He has written a number of transcriptions for flute and guitar. His musical compositions are published by six French publishers and one Canadian publisher. He is also the author of a number of pedagogical works on guitar playing.

Education
Jean-Maurice Mourat started his musical studies in his hometown of Luçon (Vendée). His first subjects were solfège (sight-singing) and piano. While studying solfège at the conservatoire de La Roche-sur-Yon, he started to teach himself classical guitar and jazz guitar. As well, he started to learn the clarinet. After meeting the Italian guitarist Oscar Ghiglia, the assistant of Andrés Segovia, he decided to focus on classical guitar. He went on to do advanced guitar study with the Brazilian virtuoso Turibio Santos. He also studied guitar with Angelo Gilardino. He worked on composition studies with Christian Gouinguené and later with Yvonne Desportes, a composer and former professor from the Conservatoire National de Musique de Paris. He also studied tuba with Gérard Pérez. Finally, he studied lute, which he performed with organ, harpsichord, and orchestral accompaniment.

Career

Positions as guitar teacher 

 1966-1970, guitar teacher at the Paris conservatoire du XIIIe arrondissement.
 1967-1987, teacher at the conservatoire d’Antony, in the Hauts-de-Seine.
 1969-1970, teacher at l’école de Viry-Châtillon, in Essonne.
 1970-1975, teacher at the conservatoires in Saint-Michel-sur-Orge and Grigny.
 1973-1974, teacher at the conservatoire municipal de musique de Palaiseau in Essonne.

Positions as director of conservatories 

 1972-1988, Director of the conservatoire municipal de musique de Grigny.
 1980-1993, Director of the conservatoire agréé de musique de Sainte-Geneviève-des-Bois.

Honours
Mourat received a number of decorations and honours. After a successful concert tour in Germany, the mayor of Schwabach gave him a decoration in 1976. In 1988, the mayor of Torredonjimeno in Spain gave Mourat the Blason d’or of his town. In 1989, the mayor of Sainte-Geneviève-des-Bois gave him the town medal for his contributions to the town conservatoire and for his musical activities.

In 1990, the Ministre de l'Éducation nationale named him chevalier of l’Ordre des Palmes académiques for Mourat's pedagogical contributions. In 2001, he was promoted to Officer of this Ordre. In 2002, after a series of concerts with flutist Philippe Neureuter, the mayor of Luçon gave him the medal of the city.

In 2012, the city of Linares and the Andrés Segovia Foundation gave him the Andrés Segovia medal for his musical achievements and for the concerto he wrote to commemorate the death of the Maestro of Linares.

Works

Methods and music collections 
 Guitar methods (Éditions Billaudot)
 Guitariste ... et vous ?
 Six cordes, une guitare
 volume I : technique de base
 volume II : études des positions
 volume III : technique supérieure
 Collections of works for guitar (Éditions Combre-Paris)
 La guitare classique vol. A  (with CD), vol. B  (with CD), vol. C, vol. D (nouvelle version)
 New collection of works for guitar (Éditions Combre)
 Les classiques à la guitare vol. 1  (with CD)
 Les classiques à la guitare vol. 2
 Collection for guitar duos (Éditions Combre)
 Les nouveaux duos (48 duos for two guitars)
 Collection for flute and guitar (with Guy Cottin - Éditions Combre)
 La flûte et guitare classique, vol. A (with CD), vol. B
 Collection of works from the xix century for guitar (Éditions Billaudot)  
 La guitare au XIXe - volumes 1-5  
 Collection of the Great Masters for guitar (Éd. Combre)
 England
 Spain 
 Italy
 France -  volumes 1-2
 Germany - volumes 1-2

For solo guitar

Other publishers 

 Productions d'Oz, Québec 
 Guitare : Pensées intimes ◦ (1. Lullaby for Yumi ; 2. Nana para Lilian ; 3. María Rosa ; 4.Canción de cumpleaños ; 5. Love song) • Fundación Segovia ◦ (1. Museo ; 2. Barcarola ; 3. Danza andaluza) • Luz de Linares (en hommage à Estudio sin luz, d'Andrés Segovia) • 17 Mini sketches • Images enfantine • Les 4 saisons du choro (1. Printemps ; 2. été ; 3. automne ; 4. hiver) • 5 Valses, (Dédiées à Arnaud Dumond) • 14 Mini-préludes • 6 Mini valses • Romance for love • Toccata • Guitarist's week • Guitarist's Calendar • Gamineries, 13 pièces pour débutants • Concerto Andalusí (Hommage à Andrés Segovia)
 Flûte et guitare • Paraná • Hommage au Siècle d'Or • 10 Mini duos • 3 Norcturnos de Granada • Concerto pour un gentilhomme
 Duo de guitares : Primeros pinitos • 7 aventures à 2 • Paradisíaco, pour 2 guitares
 Trio de guitares : Paseo por Sevilla • Trio Albolote • Mi minueto favorito • 4 Minuetos • Sonate en trio • Mais, que dit mon trouvère ? • À la manière de... / Menuet
 Quatuor de guitares : Amadeus
 Violon et guitare : Soir d'été à Grenade
 Violoncelle et guitare : Comme une prière
 Piano et guitare : 3 Contes de grand-mères
 Éditions Sempre Più - Paris
 Parfum d'automne
 Éditions musicales transatlantiques : 14 Mini-études • Facilissimo (10 pièces) • Satinade
 Éditions Dubois
 Para  ti : Canción • Danza
 6 couleurs sur la guitare (Mi - Jaune ; La - Rouge ; Ré - Vert ; Sol - Bleu ; Si - Rose ; Mi - Orange
 En recuerdo''' (La guit’art)
 Éditions Hortensia-Leduc
 Interlude''
 Revue de guitare espagnole « Ocho Sonoro » : Ocho Sonoro • Carnaval • Canción y Danza • Nostalgia • Campanas • Habanerita • Poesía • Paseo

Chamber music 

 Duos de guitare
 Les nouveaux duos classiques (Éditions Combre)
 E Z Jazz
 Recordando
 Folk danse
 Malagueña
 Spleen
 Variations sur la Folía
 Pour flûte et guitare (Éditions Billaudot)
 Ibériade
 Al-Andalus
 Leyenda
 Medina
 Guadalquivir
 Guitare et quatuor à cordes (Six cordes… une guitare vol. 2)
 En ce temps là

Flute and guitar collection (éditions Billaudot)

References

External links 

1945 births
Living people
Classical guitarists
French composers
French guitarists
Pages with unreviewed translations
People from Vendée